Denys de La Patellière (8 March 1921 in Nantes, France–21 July 2013) was a French film director and scriptwriter. He also directed Television series.

of 92.

Filmography as director
 1955 : Les Aristocrates, with Pierre Fresnay
 1956 : The Wages of Sin, with Danielle Darrieux, Jean-Claude Pascal, Jeanne Moreau
 1957 : The Ostrich Has Two Eggs, with Pierre Fresnay
 1957 : Retour de manivelle, with Michèle Morgan, Daniel Gélin, Peter van Eyck, Bernard Blier
 1958 : The Possessors, with Jean Gabin, Jean Desailly, Pierre Brasseur, Bernard Blier
 1959 : Rue des prairies, with Jean Gabin, Marie-José Nat, Claude Brasseur
 1959 : Eyes of Love, with Danielle Darrieux and Jean-Claude Brialy
 1960 : Taxi for Tobruk, with Lino Ventura, Charles Aznavour, Hardy Krüger and Maurice Biraud
 1961 : Emile's Boat, with Lino Ventura, Annie Girardot, Michel Simon and Pierre Brasseur
 1963 :  Destination Rome, with Charles Aznavour, Serena Vergano and Marisa Merlini
 1964 : God's Thunder, with Jean Gabin, Lilli Palmer, Michèle Mercier, Robert Hossein
 1964 : Marco the Magnificent, with Horst Buchholz, Anthony Quinn, Orson Welles, Omar Sharif, Elsa Martinelli, Akim Tamiroff
 1965 : The Upper Hand, with Jean Gabin, George Raft, Gert Fröbe, Nadja Tiller, Mireille Darc
 1966 : Soleil noir, with Daniel Gélin, Michèle Mercier, Valentina Cortese
 1966 : Le Voyage du père, with Fernandel
 1968 : Darling Caroline, with France Anglade, Vittorio De Sica, Bernard Blier, Charles Aznavour, Gert Fröbe, Jean-Claude Brialy, Karin Dor
 1968 : Le tatoué, with Jean Gabin and Louis de Funès
 1972 : , with Jean Gabin, Fabio Testi, Bernard Blier, Gérard Depardieu
 1973 : Forbidden Priests, with Robert Hossein, Claude Jade
 1980 : Le Comte de Monte-Cristo, with Jacques Weber (TV)
 1990 : Paparoff se dédouble, with Michel Constantin, Pascale Petit (TV)
 1992 : Diamond Swords, with Caroline Goodall, Jason Flemyng

Filmography as scenarist 
 La Tour, prends garde ! (1958)

References

External links

1921 births
2013 deaths
Mass media people from Nantes
French film directors
French military personnel of World War II